Elections to the Clackmannan District Council took place in May 1992, alongside elections to the councils of Scotland's various other districts.

Aggregate results

References

Clackmannanshire Council elections
1992 Scottish local elections